Rakesh Mavai is an Indian politician from Madhya Pradesh. He is the Indian National Congress MLA of Morena state Assembly constituency.

References

Living people
Indian National Congress politicians from Madhya Pradesh
Year of birth missing (living people)
Madhya Pradesh MLAs 2018–2023